The 2021–22 FA Cup qualifying rounds opened the 141st edition of the FA Cup, the world's oldest association football single knockout competition, organised by The Football Association, the governing body for the sport in England. The 32 winning teams from the fourth qualifying round progressed to the First round proper; which was played in November.

Calendar

Extra preliminary round
The draw for the extra preliminary round was made on 9 July 2021. This round included nine teams from tier 10, the lowest tier in the competition.

Preliminary round
The draw for the preliminary round was made on 9 July 2021. This round included Campion and Kensington & Ealing Borough from tier 10, the two lowest ranked teams remaining in the competition.

First qualifying round
The draw for the first qualifying round was made on 23 August 2021, and saw 87 clubs from Level 7 joining the 155 winners from the preliminary round. This round included 63 teams from tier 9, the lowest ranked teams remaining in the competition.

Second qualifying round
The draw for the second qualifying round was made on 6 September 2021, and saw 43 clubs from Level 6 joining the 121 winners from the first qualifying round. This round included 19 teams from tier 9, the lowest ranked teams remaining in the competition.

Third qualifying round
The draw for the third qualifying round was made on 20 September 2021, and consists of the 82 winners from the second qualifying round. Ties will be played over the weekend of 2 October 2021. This round includes 6 teams from tier 9, the lowest ranked teams remaining in the competition.

Fourth qualifying round
The draw for the fourth qualifying round was made on 4 October 2021, seeing 23 clubs from Level 5 join the 41 winners from the previous round. The draw included one team from Level 9, Hanley Town, who were eliminated after losing their replay. This left 8 teams from tier 8 as the lowest ranked teams remaining in the competition.

Broadcasting
The qualifying rounds were not covered by the FA Cup's broadcasting contracts held by BBC Sport and ITV, although one game per round was broadcast by the BBC on its media platforms.

Notes

References

External links
 The FA Cup

qualifying rounds
FA Cup qualifying rounds